John Weeks (1941 – 26 July 2020) was an American  economist.

Life
Weeks, born in Austin, Texas, was Professor Emeritus at the School of Oriental and African Studies of the University of London. His research interests were in theoretical and policy-applied macroeconomics and economic development. He published academic papers, books and policy reports in these areas. 

He is credited with coining the phrase "quantity theory of competition" to reflect a proposition that more competition in various aspects of the markets (producers, consumers, and workers) will create a more efficient economy.

In August 2015, Weeks endorsed Jeremy Corbyn's campaign in the Labour Party leadership election.

He died on 26 July 2020.

Selected works
Economics of the 1% (2014)
Capital, Exploitation and Economic Crisis (2011)

References

Further reading
The Economics of the 1%, 3-part interview, The real news network
Free Markets: Yellow Brick Road to War, Naked Capitalism

21st-century American economists
Academics of SOAS University of London
American development economists
1941 births
2020 deaths
Writers from Austin, Texas